Waynesborough, also known as the Gen. Anthony Wayne House, is a historic house museum at 2049 Waynesborough Road in Easttown Township, Chester County, Pennsylvania. Built in 1724 and repeatedly enlarged, it was for many years the home of American Revolutionary War general Anthony Wayne (1745–1796). A National Historic Landmark, it is now a museum operated by the Philadelphia Society for the Preservation of Landmarks, offering tours and event rentals.

Description and history
It is a roughly U-shaped stone structure, the main block  stories in height and covered by a gabled roof. It is five bays wide, with a center entrance sheltered by a gabled hood. The roof has two gabled dormers to the front and three to the rear, with two interior stone chimneys. Lower two-story wings extend toward the rear on the right side and to the left on the left side. The left (west) wing is the oldest portion of the house.

The oldest portion of the house was built by Wayne's grandfather, Captain W.M. Wayne, in 1724. Captain Wayne's son enlarged the house in 1765 and a wing was added in 1812. It was at Waynesborough that Anthony Wayne was born in 1745, and it was his home for all but the last five years of his life. Wayne continued his father's farm and tannery, and became involved in the Patriot cause early in the American Revolution. He distinguished himself as a military leader in the American Revolutionary War for his brash and sometimes risky maneuvers, winning him the moniker "Mad" Anthony. He died in what is now Erie, Pennsylvania, while leading troops in the aftermath of the Northwest Indian War.

The Waynesborough property remained in the hands of Wayne's direct descendants until 1965, and was in 1980 transferred to a local preservation group. The Philadelphia Society for the Preservation of Landmarks now manages the property, and offers tours from mid-March through December on Thursday through Sunday.

Gallery

See also
List of National Historic Landmarks in Pennsylvania
National Register of Historic Places listings in eastern Chester County, Pennsylvania

References

External links

Historic Waynesborough – official web site
Philadelphia Society for the Preservation of Landmarks: Waynesborough
 Waynesborough, 2049 Waynesborough Road (Easttown Township), Paoli, Chester County, PA: 5 photos, 7 data pages, and 1 photo caption page at Historic American Buildings Survey

National Historic Landmarks in Pennsylvania
Museums in Chester County, Pennsylvania
Houses on the National Register of Historic Places in Pennsylvania
Historic American Buildings Survey in Pennsylvania
Houses completed in 1724
Historic house museums in Pennsylvania
Biographical museums in Pennsylvania
Houses in Chester County, Pennsylvania
American Revolutionary War museums in Pennsylvania
Georgian architecture in Pennsylvania
National Register of Historic Places in Chester County, Pennsylvania
1724 establishments in Pennsylvania
Homes of United States Founding Fathers